The Major League Baseball China Series, or MLB China Series, were two  spring training games between the San Diego Padres and Los Angeles Dodgers played in the People's Republic of China. It marked the first time Major League Baseball teams played in China, part of an effort to popularize baseball in that country. The games were played on March 15 and 16 at the now-demolished Wukesong Baseball Stadium in Beijing. During the series, both teams visited the Great Wall of China and the Padres held a clinic for the students at Fengtai School.

Series summary 
The series was composed of two spring training games, and all stats gained in the series were counted as such.

Game 1 
The first game was held on March 15, 2008.

Game 2 
The second game was held on March 16, 2008.

See also
Baseball awards#China (People's Republic of China): Chinese Baseball Association
List of Major League Baseball games played outside the United States and Canada
MLB Japan Opening Series 2008
MLB Japan All-Star Series
MLB Taiwan All-Star Series
2019 MLB London Series

References

External links 
 Major League Baseball official website
 Series coverage 

2008 Major League Baseball season
Major League Baseball international baseball competitions
Baseball competitions in China
Major League Baseball competitions
2008 in Chinese sport
Los Angeles Dodgers
San Diego Padres
March 2008 sports events in Asia